The Deputy Minister Stakes is a Thoroughbred horse race run annually at Woodbine Racetrack in Toronto, Ontario, Canada. An Ontario Sire Stakes, it is a restricted race for three-year-old horses sired by a stallion standing in the province of Ontario during the year of their birth. Run in mid July, it is contested over a distance of seven furlongs on Polytrack (dirt from 1997–2006) and currently carries a purse of $96,000 + .

Inaugurated in 1997, the race was named in honour of Canadian Horse Racing Hall of Fame inductee, Deputy Minister, a Canadian-bred colt who earned Canadian Sovereign and American Eclipse awards during his racing career and who became a very influential stallion. He was the Leading sire in North America in 1997 and 1998, and the Leading broodmare sire in North America in 2007.

For 2006 only, the race was contested over seven and a half furlongs.

Records
Speed  record: (at current distance of seven furlongs)
 1:21.80 - Matterofintegrity (1997)

Most wins by an owner:
 2 - Margaret Squires (1999, 2004)

Most wins by a jockey:
 3 - Emile Ramsammy (2000, 2001, 2002)
 3 - Todd Kabel (2003, 2006, 2007)

Most wins by a trainer:
 4 - Robert Tiller (2007, 2010, 2013, 2014)

Winners of the Deputy Minister Stakes

Ontario Sire Stakes
Ungraded stakes races in Canada
Flat horse races for three-year-olds
Recurring sporting events established in 1997
Woodbine Racetrack